The Taotie is an ancient Chinese mythological creature that was commonly emblazoned on bronze and other artifacts during the 1st millennium BC. Taotie are one of the "four evil creatures of the world". They are opposed by the Four Holy Creatures, the Azure Dragon, Vermilion Bird, White Tiger and Black Tortoise. The four fiends are also juxtaposed with the four benevolent animals which are Qilin, Dragon, Turtle and Fenghuang.

The Taotie is often represented as a motif on dings, which are Chinese ritual bronze vessels from the Shang (1766-1046 BCE) and Zhou dynasties (1046–256 BCE). The design typically consists of a zoomorphic mask, described as being frontal,  bilaterally symmetrical, with a pair of raised eyes and typically no lower jaw area. Some argue that the design can be traced back to jade pieces found at Neolithic sites belonging to the Liangzhu culture (3310–2250 BCE).  There is also notable similarity with the painted pottery shards found at Lower Xiajiadian cultural sites (2200–1600 BCE).

Etymology

Although modern scholars use the word "Taotie", it is actually not known what word the Shang and Zhou dynasties used to call the design on their bronze vessels; as American paleographer and scholar of ancient China Sarah Allan notes, there is no particular reason to assume that the term taotie was known during the Shang period. The first known usage of Taotie is in the Zuo Zhuan, a narrative history of China written in 30 chapters between 722 and 468 BCE. It is used to refer to one of the four evil creatures of the world : a greedy and gluttonous son of the Jinyun clan, who lived during the time of the mythical Yellow Emperor (c.2698–2598 BCE). Within the Zuo Zhuan, taotie is used by the writer to imply a "glutton".

Nonetheless, the association of the term taotie is synonymous with the motifs found on the ancient Zhou (and Shang) bronzes. The following passage from Lü Buwei's Spring and Autumn Annals (16/3a, "Prophecy") states:

However, Allan believes the second part of the sentence should be translated as follows because the association between gluttony (the meaning in Zuo Zhuan) and the dings use for food sacrifices to the "insatiable" spirits of the dead is significant.

Li Zehou, a Chinese scholar of philosophy and intellectual history, thinks the description of the taotie in the Spring and Autumn Annals has a much deeper meaning and that "the meaning of 'taotie is not [about] "eating people" but making a mysterious communication between people and Heaven (gods)."

Bronze motifs

Scholars have long been perplexed over the meaning (if any) of this theriomorphic design, and there is still no commonly held single answer. The hypotheses range from Robert Bagley's belief that the design is a result of the casting process, and rather than having an iconographic meaning was the artistic expression of the artists who held the technological know-how to cast bronze,  to theories that it depicts ancient face masks that may have once been worn by either shamans or the god-kings who were the link between humankind and their deceased ancestors (Jordan Paper).

The once-popular belief that the faces depicted the animals used in the sacrificial ceremonies has now more or less been rejected (the faces of oxen, tigers, dragons, etc. may not even be meant to depict actual animals). Modern academics favor an interpretation that supports the idea that the faces have meaning in a religious or ceremonial context, as the objects they appear on are almost always associated with such events or roles. As one scholar writes "art styles always carry some social references." Shang divination inscriptions shed no light on the meaning of the taotie.

Later interpretations

During the Ming dynasty, a number of scholars compiled lists of traditional motifs seen in architecture and applied art, which eventually became codified as the Nine Children of the Dragon. In the earliest known list of this type (in which the creatures are not yet called "children of the dragon", and there are 14 of them, rather than 9), given by Lu Rong  (1436–1494) in his Miscellaneous records from the bean garden (Shuyuan zaji), the taotie appears with a rather unlikely description, as a creature that likes water and depicted on bridges. However, a well-known later list of the Nine Children of the Dragon given by Yang Shen (1488–1559) accords with both the ancient and the modern usage of the term:

Some scholars believed that the Taotie motif is a reference to Chi You and is used to serve as a warning to people who covet power and wealth.

In the Book of Imaginary Beings (1957), Jorge Luis Borges interpreted the figures as representing a dog-headed, double-bodied monster that represented greed and gluttony.

In popular culture
 
The Tao Tie (spelled as "Tao Tei") are the primary antagonists in the 2016 historical-fantasy epic film The Great Wall. In the film, they are depicted as green-skinned quadrupedal alien creatures, with shark-like teeth, eyes located on their shoulders, and the Tao Tie motif visible on their heads. They are shown living in a eusocial hive similar to ants, where they attack the capital of China every 60 years to collect food to feed their queen.

Taotie is the name of a warthog enemy character in DreamWorks's animated series Kung Fu Panda: Legends of Awesomeness.

Taotie, Shadow of the Yang Zing is a dragon-like creature in the trading card game Yu-Gi-Oh!.

Taotie is one of the Four Perils of the Grandis in the MapleStory.

The Taotie appear in Valt the Wonder Deer.

Alongside the other Four Perils, Taotie is depicted in Highschool DxD/Slash Dog light novel series as a legendary demonic monster, who was exterminated in ancient times and its soul sealed into a Sacred Gear in the form of a masked racoon wielded Nanadaru Shigune, reflecting Taotie's gluttony, its has the power to devour absolutely anything.

Taotie is a recurring demon in the Shin Megami Tensei franchise.

Yuuma Toutetsu, from the Touhou Project series, is a Taotie who appears as the final boss of the 17.5th entry, Sunken Fossil World, as the culprit of the incident. Her ability, akin to a Taotie, is to absorb absolutely anything, whether its body is physical, spiritual, organic, or inorganic.

Ting-Lu, a legendary Pokemon introduced in Pokemon Scarlet and Violet, is based on the Taotie.

See also
Four Symbols (China)
Four Perils

Notes

References

 
K. C. Chang, Art, Myth, and Ritual: The Path to Political Authority in Ancient China. Cambridge, Massachusetts: Harvard University Press, 1983.
Mircea Eliade, Shamanism, trans. W. R. Trask. NY: Bollingen Foundation, 1964.
 , translated by Gong Lizeng. There is an excerpt on taotie at AsianArt Study Guide.
Jordan Paper, "The Meaning of the 'T'ao-T'ieh'" in History of Religions, Vol. 18, No. 1 (August, 1978), pp. 18–41.
Roderick Whitfield, ed. The Problem of Meaning in Chinese Ritual Bronzes. London: School of Oriental and African Studies, 1993.
  (Section 1, Section 2, Section 3).

Chinese iconography
Four Perils
Shang dynasty bronzeware
Zhou dynasty bronzeware